Argelia Laya (10 July 1926 – 27 November 1997) was an Afro-Venezuelan educator and women's rights activist. She campaigned for women's suffrage and was one of the first Venezuelan women to openly speak of a woman's right to have children outside of wedlock or obtain an abortion. She advocated for the decriminalization of abortion and the right of both students and teachers to attend school regardless of whether they were pregnant. In the 1960s, she served as a guerrilla fighter for the communist party, later breaking away from the party to help found the Movement to Socialism (MAS).

Early life
Argelia Mercedes Laya López was born on 10 July 1926 on a cacao plantation in San José del Río Chico, in the state of Miranda, Venezuela, to Rosario López and Pedro María Laya. She was the third of four siblings and was of Afro-Venezuelan heritage. Because her father took part in armed movements against the dictator Juan Vicente Gómez, he was imprisoned several times and finally banished from Miranda in 1936. He died later that year, leaving the family to face financial hardships. At that time, the family, moved to Caracas where Laya entered the Normal School. While still in school, she founded the Center for Student Novelist and used it as a platform to argue for women's right to education and social and political equality. She formulated her ideas into a national plan establishing principles and strategies to eliminate gender discrimination. She graduated with her teaching degree in 1945 at the age of 19.

Careers
That same year, a coup d'etat overthrew President Isaías Medina Angarita's regime and Laya was sent to La Guaira to work on a literacy campaign. In 1946, Laya co-founded the National Union of Women Organization and served as the secretary of the organization through 1958. She called for debates and urged that women be granted suffrage. During her early years of teaching, Laya had a child and as an unmarried mother was suspended from teaching. Writing a letter of protest to the Education Minister, Luis Beltrán Pietro Figueroa, she put forth her right to be unmarried and have a child and her right not have biases prevent her from seeking services for her child from organizations like child care and health care facilities. After several months, she was allowed to return to teaching, but became more vocal about the ways in which women faced discrimination.

Laya also organized the Women’s Committee of the Patriotic Board and served in te Legion of Women Nationalists. Teaching classes in mental health she advocated for protecting the sexual and reproductive rights of women, advocating for both safe pregnancies and abortions. Laya was one of the earliest Venezuelan women to advocate for abortion rights and decriminalization of the procedure. Laya later became majorly involved in these issues during her time as a board member of the Venezuelan association for alternative sexual education and defense of the violated women. She became Assistant Secretary of the Venezuelan Teachers Federation and an active collaborator with the Board of Directors of the Association of Journalists and Writers in the capital of Vargas. Lara also served as Vice Chancellor at the Victor Camejo Oberto Popular University.

In the 1950s, Laya joined the Communist Party of Venezuela in opposition of dictator Marcos Pérez Jiménez. Two years later, she married and subsequently had three more children. By 1959, in response to the political problems in the country, she had joined the Communist Party's guerrilla groups and operated as Commandant Jacinta. For six years, she participated in guerrilla activities as part of the underground. In the late 1960s, she served as vice president of the First Congress of Venezuelan Women. Advocating for workplace protections including maternity leave and child care centers, the Congress helped to formulate laws to protect the health and employment environments of the working class. Towards the end of her time with the guerrilla group, she became more passionate towards advocating for disadvantaged people’s (women, minority and working class) rights instead of fighting for military and political power over Venezuela. In the early 1970s, she joined a splinter group of the communist party, which split off and formed the Movement to Socialism (MAS). As one of the founders, Laya was the first woman to occupy such a high position in any political party in Venezuela. Before the split off Laya attended a fair hosted by the French communist party, as she still identified herself as a communist at that time, in which she was able to travel through Hungary, Romania, Bulgaria and the Soviet Union. In this trip, she discovered that the problem of machismo was not only existent in Latin culture but a world-wide phenomenon. Work pay inequality in these countries, as well as in her own, was a major issue for which Laya would strongly advocate. 1970 was a year of change in her political views as she ended a 20 year long communist affiliation to turn towards socialism. As women's secretary of the new party, she pressed for a code of ethics to be established for the protection of workers, laws to prohibit violence against women.

In the 1980s, Laya served on the Women’s Advisory Commission to the Presidency of the Republic and was an advisor to the Transcultural Institute of Studies of Black Women. In 1982, she took part in the civil code reforms to eliminate discrimination in adoption procedures to protect both mothers and children's rights. In 1985, she was selected to attend the United Nation’s Third World Conference on Women, held in Nairobi, Kenya as the Venezuelan delegate. During the decade, she also served as Venezuela's representative at the Inter-American Commission of Women and was part of the women's health initiative undertaken by the government. In 1988 Laya unsuccessfully ran as an MAS candidate for governor of the state of Miranda and two years later, became party president. With this accomplishment, she earned the title of the first woman and first of African descent (Afro-Latina/Afro-Venezuelan) to obtain such position. In 1994 she attended the First Meeting to Discuss Women and Education in Bolivia. There, she helped draft a program for eliminating sexism through education. The plan called for gender issues to become integral parts of study and dialogue throughout the entirety of one's education.

Death
Laya died on 27 November 1997 in Caracas at the age of 71.

References

Citations

Bibliography

 

1926 births
1997 deaths
People from Miranda (state)
Venezuelan women activists
Venezuelan activists
Afro-Venezuelan
Venezuelan women's rights activists
Venezuelan women educators
Venezuelan socialists
Venezuelan communists
Venezuelan guerrillas
Venezuelan suffragists
Women in 20th-century warfare
Women in war in South America
Death in Caracas